The 1885–86 season is the 12th season of competitive football by Rangers.

Overview
Rangers played a total matches during the 1885–86 season.

Results
All results are written with Rangers' score first.

Scottish Cup

FA Cup

Appearances

See also
 1885–86 in Scottish football
 1885–86 Scottish Cup

External links
1885–86 Rangers F.C.Results

Rangers F.C. seasons
Rangers